The canton of Coutances is an administrative division of the Manche department, northwestern France. Its borders were modified at the French canton reorganisation which came into effect in March 2015. Its seat is in Coutances.

It consists of the following communes:

Brainville
Bricqueville-la-Blouette
Cambernon
Camprond
Courcy
Coutances
Gratot
Heugueville-sur-Sienne
Monthuchon
Nicorps
Orval-sur-Sienne
Regnéville-sur-Mer
Saint-Pierre-de-Coutances
Saussey
Tourville-sur-Sienne
La Vendelée

References

Cantons of Manche